Privel Hinkati (born 8 December 1988 in Caen) is a French rower representing Benin.

He won the bronze medal at the 2017 African Championships in Tunis. By finishing 5th at the sculls final during the 2019 African Championships, he became the first Beninese rower to qualify for the Olympics, the 2020 Summer Olympics.

At the 2020 Summer Olympics, he placed 27th in men's single sculls.

Reference

External links
 

1988 births
Living people
Citizens of Benin through descent
Beninese male rowers
French male rowers
Rowers at the 2020 Summer Olympics
Olympic rowers of Benin
Black French sportspeople
French sportspeople of Beninese descent
Sportspeople from Caen